Ullasamga Utsahamga is a 2008 Indian Telugu-language romantic comedy film written and directed by A. Karunakaran. The film stars Yasho Sagar and Sneha Ullal in their debut. With music composed by G. V. Prakash Kumar, the film was released on 25 July 2008. It was remade into Kannada as Ullasa Utsaha (2009).

Plot
Dhanalakshmi alias Dhana is the only daughter of a landlord who has over 50 crore property. As she lost her mother in her childhood, her father marries another woman. However, Dhana faces neglect from her stepmother. After Dhana's father passes away, there is no one to console her, and the only friend who showed affection was Balaji. He too leaves her after she completes her schooling. After Dhana grew up, she bequeaths her father's property, and her mother eyes it and wanted to marry Dhana against her wishes. Then, Dhana escapes from her house and takes shelter in her friend's house in Hyderabad.

Aravind, the son of a garage owner, is a vagabond. He comes across Dhana and loses his heart to her. However, after a few encounters, Dhana gets caught by her stepmother, and when she is about take her away, Aravind helps her from the abduction with the help of police. This makes Dhana befriend Aravind, and she reveals her childhood friendship and tells him that she is in love with Balaji and cannot imagine any other in his place. After refusal, Aravind decides to seek employment in Kolkata. At the same time, Dhana also learns that Balaji is in Kolkata.

They both again meet in a train, and accidentally, Dhana misses the train during the journey. Aravind helps her reach Kolkata to meet Balaji. In the process, Aravind gets severely hurt in the hands of a criminal, who tries to implicate Dhana in a narcotics case. Later, Aravind takes Dhana to Balaji's house in Kolkata. Dhana's stepmother also reaches Kolkata and agrees for Dhana's marriage with Balaji. When the marriage is about to take place, Dhana realises that her stepmother enacted a drama and created a fake Balaji to impress Dhana. Again, Aravind comes to her rescue, and at that time, Dhana realizes that she is in love with Aravind. The film ends on a happy note.

Cast

 Yasho Sagar as Aravind
 Sneha Ullal as Dhanalakshmi
 Brahmanandam as Colony Secretary
 Sunil as Malli Babu
 Chandra Mohan as Arvind's father
 Sudha as Aravind's mother
 Prasad Babu as Dhanalakshmi's father
 Kavitha as Dhanalakshmi's stepmother
 Surekha Vani as Aravind's elder sister
 Satya Krishnan as Aravind's sister-in-law
 Sattanna as Surekha Vani's husband (S/W Engineer)
 Suman Setty as Ganesh, Aravind's friend
 Ping Pong Surya as Aravind's friend
 Sri Latha as Dhanalakshmi's friend
 Kallu Krishna Rao as Dhanalakshmi's family member
 L. B. Sriram as Subbayya, Dhanalakshmi's servant
 Karthikeya as Fake Balaji
 Ashok Kumar as Police Officer
 Venu Madhav as Fraud Billionaire
 Dharmavarapu Subramanyam as Car Lift
 Allari Subhashini as Ganesh's mother
 Gautam Raju as Babu Rao Properties
 Ananth Babu

Box office
The movie received positive reviews from both critics and the audience. The movie was declared a blockbuster at the box office.

Soundtrack

The soundtrack consisted of seven songs composed by G. V. Prakash. Lyrics were written by Anantha Sriram. The audio of the film was released on 7 May 2008. The song "Priyatama" was later reused for the Tamil film Saguni.

Award(s)
 A. Karunakaran won the Nandi Award for Best Screenplay Writer.

References

External links
 

2008 films
Films directed by A. Karunakaran
Telugu films remade in other languages
Films scored by G. V. Prakash Kumar
Indian romantic comedy films
Films shot in Kolkata
Films set in Kolkata
Films shot in Hyderabad, India
2000s Telugu-language films
2008 romantic comedy films